Life in Motion: An Unlikely Ballerina is an autobiography by Misty Copeland, written with Charisse Jones, published March 4, 2014 by Aladdin. In the book, Copeland discusses her history toward becoming the only African-American soloist with the American Ballet Theatre following a life in which she and her family lived in poverty. 

A young readers edition was published December 6, 2016.

The book was a New York Times bestseller.

Reception 
Life in Motion received a starred review from Booklist, as well as positive reviews from Kirkus, The Washington Post, Publishers Weekly, The New York Times, People, Ebony, JET, Chicago Sun-Times, Los Angeles Magazine, The Philadelphia Inquirer, The LA Sentinel, Bildungsroman, The Inlander, The NWI Times, and BookPage.

The book also received the following accolades:

 YALSA's Popular Paperbacks for Young Adults Top Ten selection (2017)
Booklist's Top 10 Multicultural Nonfiction (2015)

Booklist's Top 10 Arts Books (2014)
New York Times Bestseller

References 

African-American autobiographies
Books about ballet
African-American ballet dancers
2014 non-fiction books